Bogdan Adrian Vasile (born 2 February 1995) is a Romanian professional footballer who plays as a midfielder for Gloria Bistrița-Năsăud. Vasile grew up at Gheorghe Hagi Football Academy, but never played for the senior team of the club, Viitorul Constanța. He was loaned at teams such as: Voluntari, Chindia Târgoviște or Zimbru Chișinău until the summer of 2017 when he signed a contract with Dunărea Călărași.

Honours
FC Voluntari
Liga II: 2014–15
Dunărea Călărași
Liga II: 2017–18

References

External links
 
 

1995 births
Living people
Sportspeople from Arad, Romania
Romanian footballers
Association football midfielders
Romania youth international footballers
FC Viitorul Constanța players
Liga II players
Liga III players
FC Voluntari players
AFC Chindia Târgoviște players
FC Dunărea Călărași players
SSU Politehnica Timișoara players
AFC Unirea Slobozia players
Moldovan Super Liga players
FC Zimbru Chișinău players
CS Gloria Bistrița-Năsăud footballers
Romanian expatriate footballers
Romanian expatriate sportspeople in Moldova
Expatriate footballers in Moldova